2013 in the Philippines details events of note that happened in the Philippines in the year 2013.

Incumbents

 President: Benigno S. Aquino III (Liberal)
 Vice President: Jejomar C. Binay, Sr. (PDP–Laban)
 Congress (15th, ended June 6): 
 Senate President: 
 Juan Ponce Enrile, Sr. (PMP) – resigned June 5
 Jinggoy Estrada (PMP) – acting June 5 to 6
 House Speaker: Feliciano Belmonte, Jr. (Liberal)
 Congress (16th, convened July 22): 
 Senate President: Franklin M. Drilon (Liberal) – elected July 22
 House Speaker: Feliciano R. Belmonte, Jr. (Liberal) – elected July 22
 Chief Justice: Maria Lourdes P.A. Sereno

Events

January
January 17 – USS Guardian (MCM-5), an American mine countermeasures ship, ran ground at Tubbataha Reef, testing relations between the Philippines and the United States.

February

February 12 – Philippine gunmen claiming to be part of the royal army of the Sulu Sultanate lands on Lahad Datu, Sabah causing a standoff which tested bilateral relations between the Philippines and Malaysia.

March
March 4 – The Gramercy Residences, the tallest residential building in the Philippines at 250m is opened.
March 16 – The Solaire Resort & Casino at the Entertainment City in Parañaque opens to the public, becoming the first resort-casino complex to open in the area.
March 25 – President Aquino III, signs Anti Drugged and Drunk Driving Law of 2013 or RA. 10586.

April
April 20 – A Chinese fishing vessel with 20 fishermen on board, runs ground at the Tubbataha reef, almost two months after an American navy ship ran ground on the same reef. The fishermen will face charges of illegal poaching and attempted bribery.

May

May 2 – Former police officer Cesar Mancao, is accused of involvement in the murders of publicist Bubby Dacer and his driver Emmanuel Corbito, escaped from the custody of the National Bureau of Investigation.
May 7 – Mayon Volcano produces a surprise phreatic eruption lasting 73 seconds. Ash and rock were produced during this eruption. Ash clouds reached 500 meters above the volcano's summit, which drifted west southwest The event killed five climbers, of whom three were Germans, one was a Spaniard living in Germany and one was a Filipino tour guide while Seven others were reported injured.
May 9 – A Philippine Coastguard vessel opened fire on a Taiwanese fishing vessel, allegedly inside Philippine maritime territory, leaving one Taiwanese fisherman dead. Tensions between Taiwan and the Philippines heat up as Taiwanese President Ma Ying-jeou, threatens to impose sanctions on the Philippines a day after the incident. The Philippine Coast Guard sympathizes with the victim but refuses to apologize for the incident and insisted that its personnel are just doing their job to address illegal fishing.
May 13 – 2013 Mid-term Elections.
 May 31 – 
 A fatal explosion occurs at the Two Serendra condominium complex, in the Bonifacio Global City, Taguig.
 Multiply cease operations.

June
June 2 – Cebu Pacific Flight 971, using an Airbus A320-214 and registered as RP-C3266 carrying 165 passengers inbound from Manila, overshoots the runway at Francisco Bangoy International Airport in Davao City during heavy rain. There are no fatalities and injuries, but the plane is heavily damaged and written-off.
June 5 – Senator Juan Ponce Enrile resigns as Senate President amidst various allegations against the senator.

July
July 19 – The League of Cities of the Philippines finally acknowledges the cityhood of Baybay, Leyte; Bogo, Cebu; Catbalogan, Samar; Tandag, Surigao del Sur; Lamitan, Basilan; Borongan, Eastern Samar; Tayabas, Quezon; Tabuk, Kalinga; Bayugan, Agusan del Sur; Batac, Ilocos Norte; Mati, Davao Oriental; Guihulngan, Negros Oriental; Cabadbaran, Agusan del Norte; El Salvador, Misamis Oriental; Carcar, Cebu and Naga, Cebu. Its National Executive Board Resolution adopted on July 5 which formally recognizing the cities after the decision of the Supreme Court on the cityhood case and memoranda from the Commission on Elections (COMELEC) and the Department of Budget and Management (DBM).
July 26 – At least 8 people are killed and 48 people injured in a bomb blast at the Limketkai Center in Cagayan de Oro, Philippines.

August
August 5 – At least 8 people are killed and 40 others injured after a car bomb exploded in Cotabato City, Cotabato province in the Philippines. It is the worst such attack ever in Cotabato City.
August 9–10 – Typhoon Labuyo.
 Typhoon Utor (2013)
August 12 – MNLF leader Nur Misuari unilaterally declares the independence of the Bangsamoro Republik. The Philippine government refuses to recognize the republic and no other foreign governments has officially recognized the republic.
August 16 – MV St. Thomas Aquinas collides with MV Sulpicio Express Siete resulting in 55 deaths. 65 people remain missing.
August 18–20 – Typhoon Maring (international name Trami) Typhoon Maring hit northern Luzon, but affected the whole areas of Luzon through the Southwest Monsoon or Habagat. The southwest monsoon brought by Typhoon Maring hit Metro Manila, Cavite, some parts of Rizal and Laguna, leaving many areas flooded. Eight people were reported dead, with over 200,000 homeless.
August 26 – Widespread protests against the Priority Development Assistance Fund scam was organized nationwide. Some Filipino communities worldwide also held solidarity protest. The biggest demonstration that was held on this day was the Million People March held in Luneta Park in Manila.

August 28 – Just hours after Malacañang sets a P10-million bounty for any information leading to her arrest, Janet Napoles surrenders to President Aquino III.

September
September 9–28 – The Moro National Liberation Front and government forces clash in Zamboanga City, paralyzing economic activity in the city.
September 26 – The Comelec disqualifies Laguna governor E. R. Ejercito for poll overspending.

October

It was centered about 20 miles below the town of Sagbayan. As of October 15, it was reported that the death toll was at least 93, including people in Cebu. The following day, the death toll had risen to 144, with 291 people injured.
October 28
 The elections for the barangay officials are held.
 Davao Occidental becomes the 81st province of the Philippines by the virtue of Republic Act No. 10360
October 30 – President Aquino III address the nation in a television broadcast, to defend the Disbursement Acceleration Program (DAP) of the government.

November

November 7 – Janet Lim-Napoles, the alleged mastermind in the P10 billion pork barrel scam faces the Senate for the first time to answer the allegations against her.

November 8 – Typhoon Haiyan (known in the Philippines as Typhoon Yolanda), the deadliest Philippine typhoon on record, causes catastrophic destruction in the Visayas, particularly on the islands of Samar and Leyte, killing 6,300 people. About 11 million people have been affected by the typhoon with many left homeless.
November 15 – A group of Abu Sayyaf militant raids a resort on a Malaysian island of Pom Pom in Semporna, Sabah. During the ambush, a couples from Taiwan was on the resort when one of them been shot dead by the militant while the second victim was kidnapped and taken to the Sulu Archipelago in the southern Philippines. The victim was later freed in Sulu Province with the help of the Philippines security forces.
November 20 – The Supreme Court of the Philippines abolishes the Priority Development Assistance Fund otherwise known as the 'pork barrel'.
November 25 – The special barangay elections are held in Zamboanga City and Bohol.

December
December 2 – Drone technology is introduced for the first time in Philippine television through UNTV capturing the devastation of Typhoon Haiyan.
December 6 – Former Batangas governor Antonio Leviste is released after four years on parole.
December 9 – The Philippines and the Bangsamoro sign a power-sharing agreement, paving the way for the peace process.
December 11 – The highest number of journalists are killed in a single year since 2009 in the country reaching a total of twelve.
December 12 – The Comelec disqualifies governors Vilma Santos of Batangas, E. R. Ejercito of Laguna, Ryan Luis Singson of Ilocos Sur and Amado Espino, Jr. of Pangasinan. The commission also disqualified congressmen Gloria Macapagal Arroyo of Pampanga and Rodolfo Biazon of Muntinlupa and several elected government officials failed to submit their Statement of Contributions and Expenditures.
December 15
 Former Pagadian mayor Samuel S. Co and his wife, Priscilla are arrested. Both are facing syndicated estafa case in connection with the multi-billion Ponzi scheme of Aman Futures.
 A robbery incident happens on the jewelry section of The SM Store on the first floor amidst of Christmas shopping . Martilyo Gang were said to be the perpetrators of the incident.

December 16 – A bus operated by Don Mariano falls off the Metro Manila Skyway near Bicutan, Parañaque, killing 18 people and injuring 20 others. The accident which was the worst along the skyway at that time led to calls for the installation of speed-limiting or monitoring devices in public utility vehicles.
December 20 – A shooting that occurs at the arrival area of Ninoy Aquino International Airport in Manila killed four people, including Mayor Ukol Talumpa of Labangan, Zamboanga del Sur and his wife Lea Talumpa, and left five others injured.
December 28 – San Pedro becomes a city in the province of  Laguna through ratification of Republic Act 10420 which was approved last March 27.

Holidays

On December 11, 2009, Republic Act No. 9849 declared Eidul Adha as a regular holiday. Also amending Executive Order No. 292, also known as The Administrative Code of 1987, the following are regular and special days shall be observed. The EDSA Revolution Anniversary was proclaimed since 2002 as a special nonworking holiday. On February 25, 2004, Republic Act No. 9256 declared every August 21 as a special nonworking holiday to be known as Ninoy Aquino Day. Note that in the list, holidays in bold are "regular holidays" and those in italics are "nationwide special days".

 January 1 – New Year's Day
 February 25 – 1986 EDSA Revolution
 March 28 – Maundy Thursday
 March 29 – Good Friday
 April 9 – Araw ng Kagitingan (Day of Valor)
 May 1 – Labor Day
 May 13 – Election Day
 June 12 – Independence Day
 August 9 – Eidul Fitr
 August 21 – Ninoy Aquino Day
 August 25 – National Heroes Day
 October 15 – Eidul Adha
 November 1 – All Saints Day
 November 30 – Bonifacio Day
 December 25 – Christmas Day
 December 30 – Rizal Day
 December 31 – Last Day of the Year

In addition, several other places observe local holidays, such as the foundation of their town. These are also "special days."

Theater, culture and arts
April 14 – Ariella Arida, Bea Rose Santiago, Joanna Cindy Miranda, Mutya Johanna Datul and Pia Wurtzbach was crowned as the new Binibining Pilipinas winners. Arida was crowned by Miss Universe 2012 1st runner-up Janine Tugonon as the new Miss Universe–Philippines 2013. Santiago was crowned as the new Binibining Pilipinas–International 2013 by the outgoing titleholder Nicole Schmitz. Miranda as the new Binibining Pilipinas–Tourism 2013 crowned by Katrina Jayne Dimaranan. Datul was crowned as the new Binibining Pilipinas–Supranational 2013 by Miss Supranational 2012 3rd runner-up Elaine Kay Moll. Wurtzbach ended as the Binibining Pilipinas 2013 1st runner-up.
August 18 – Megan Young is crowned Miss World Philippines 2013 at the Solaire Resort & Casino in Parañaque
September 6 – Mutya Johanna Datul is crowned Miss Supranational 2013 and is the first Asian and first Filipina to win the title.
September 28 – Miss Philippines Megan Young was crowned Miss World 2013 and is the first Filipina to win the title.
October 5–6 – ABS-CBN marks its 60th Anniversary of the Philippine Television with the Grand Kapamilya Weekend held at the Quezon City Memorial Circle, Smart Araneta Coliseum and Marikina Sports Complex.
November 9 – Miss Philippines Ariella Arida wins third runner-up in the Miss Universe 2013 in Moscow Oblast, Russia.
November 19 – Miss Philippines Annalie Forbes won third runner-up in the Miss Grand International 2013 in Bangkok, Thailand
November 21
 Miss Philippines Amber Delos Reyes won Miss Teen Expoworld Universe 2013 held in Guatemala.
 Mister Philippines Gil Wagas won fourth runner-up in the Mister International 2013 held in Skenoo Hall, Gandaria City Mall, Jakarta, Indonesia
December 7 – Alyz Henrich from Venezuela crowned as Miss Earth 2013.
December 14 – Miss Philippines Koreen Medina won third runner-up in the Miss Intercontinental 2013 held in Magdeburg, Germany.
December 17 – Miss Philippines Bea Rose Santiago won Miss International 2013 held in Tokyo, Japan
December 31 – Miss Philippines Angeli Dione Gomez won Miss Tourism International 2013 in Putrajaya, Malaysia.

Music

Albums

Concerts
January 5 – Regine Velasquez Silver Rewind live at the Mall of Asia Arena
January 16 – Swedish House Mafia: The One Last Tour live at the Mall of Asia Arena
January 16–20 – Jabbawockeez live at the Ayala Malls
January 19 – Dream K-Pop Fantasy Concert Featuring Girls Generation, Infinite, U-Kiss, Exo M/K, Tasty, and Tahiti live at the SM Mall of Asia Concert Grounds
February 2 – TM Astig Panalo Fest Mall of Asia Arena
February 14:
Foursome live at the Mall of Asia Arena
Jessica Sanchez live at the Smart Araneta Coliseum
February 15 – Paramore live at the Mall of Asia Arena
February 16 – Psy live at the Mall of Asia Arena
February 22 – Jose Feliciano live at the Smart Araneta Coliseum
February 28 – Cliff Richard live at the Smart Araneta Coliseum
March 2 – 2PM live at the Mall of Asia Arena
March 15 – Jose & Wally Concert: A Party for Juan and All live at the Smart Araneta Coliseum
March 16 – Foursome: The Repeat live at the Mall of Asia Arena
March 20 – Demi Lovato live at the Smart Araneta Coliseum
March 22 – Bloc Party live at the World Trade Center, Hall D
March 31 – The Script live at the Smart Araneta Coliseum
April 5 – Gloria Gaynor: I Will Survive live at the NBC Tent, Fort Bonifacio, Taguig
April 6 – Julio Iglesias live at the Manila Hotel Tent City 
April 9 – Lawson live at the Eastwood Mall Open Park
April 27 – Close-Up Summer Solstice 2013 Featuring Afrojack, Alex Gaudino, Cedric Gervais, Dev, Jump Smokers, Sandwich, Spongecola, Urbandub, and Cobra Starship live at the SM Mall of Asia Concert Grounds
April 30 – Daniel Padilla: A Birthday Concert live at the Smart Araneta Coliseum
May 3 – Modern English and The Alarm: Back to the 80's – New Wave Concert Party live at the Mall of Asia Arena
May 4 – Slash live at the Smart Araneta Coliseum
May 8 – Aerosmith: The Global Warming World Tour! live at the Mall of Asia Arena
May 11 – Julie Anne San Jose: It's My Time Concert live at the Music Museum
May 14 – Jason Mraz live at the Smart Araneta Coliseum
May 15 – Avicii live at the Mall of Asia Arena
May 17 – Vice Ganda Concert: I-Vice Ganda Mo Ako sa Araneta! live at the Smart Araneta Coliseum
May 20 – Nick Vujicic: Unstoppable Concert live at the Smart Araneta Coliseum
May 26 – Alden Richards live at Trinoma
June 7 – Switch Featuring Callalily and 6cyclemind live at the Music Museum
June 12 – Freedom Rocks Independence Day Concert live at the Araneta Center
June 14:
Rico Blanco live at the Music Museum
Sungha Jung live at the J Centre Convention Hall, Mandaue City, Cebu
June 15:
Sungha Jung live at the Newport Performing Arts Theater, Resorts World Manila
CNBlue: The Blue Moon World Tour live at the Smart Araneta Coliseum
June 24 – A Royal Evening With Princess Velasco live at the Off The Grill
June 27 – Antipolo Music Festival live at the Ynares Center
June 29:
Big Fish Innovation White live at the World Trade Center
The Pianist's Pianist live at the CCP Theater
July 6 – Lee Min-ho live at the Mall of Asia Arena
July 19 – Spongecola: Maximum Capacity live at the Music Museum
July 20 – Dionne Warwick and Tavares live at The Manila Hotel Tent.
July 21 – Dionne Warwick and Tavares live at the SMX Convention Center Davao
July 23 – Dionne Warwick and Tavares live at the Smart Araneta Coliseum
July 26:
Juris Fernandez live at the Ynares Sports Arena
The XX live at the NBC Tent
July 31 – Killswitch Engage live at SM Skydome
August 6 – Pet Shop Boys live at the Smart Araneta Coliseum
August 7 – Carly Rae Jepsen live at the Smart Araneta Coliseum
August 8 – Fall Out Boy Save Rock and Roll live at the Smart Araneta Coliseum
August 9 – Mark Bautista The Sound of Love live at Music Museum
August 13:
Linkin Park: Living Things World Tour live at the Mall of Asia Arena
Air Supply: The Greatest Hits live at the Solaire Resort
August 16 – Ogie Alcasid: 25 I Write The Songs: The 25th Anniversary Celebration live at the Mall of Asia Arena
August 17:
Abra The Grand Concert live at the Globe Circuit Event Grounds, Makati
Bamboo and Yeng Constantino: By Request live at the Smart Araneta Coliseum
August 19 – Japandroids live at the Hard Rock Cafe, Glorietta III, Makati
August 20 – Side A  live at the Music Museum
August 25 – Bazooka Rocks Festival live at the SMX Convention Center
August 30 – Renee Olstead live at the Fairmont Hotel
August 31 – Big Fish Innovation Black live at the World Trade Center
September 4 – Pitbull: Global Warming Tour live at the Mall of Asia Arena
September 5 – George Benson with Patti Austin live at the Smart Araneta Coliseum
September 7:
K-Pop Republic Featuring Dal Shabet, Exo K and SHINee live at the Smart Araneta Coliseum
The Piano Guys live at the SM Mall of Asia Center Stage
Patti Austin with Joe Pizzulo live at the Crowne Plaza Ballroom
September 9 – Patti Austin with Joe Pizzulo live at the SMX Convention Center Davao
September 10 – Frankie Valli and the Four Seasons live at the Smart Araneta Coliseum
September 13 – Martin Nievera 3D Concert live at the Smart Araneta Coliseum
September 14 – Sandwich 15th Anniversary Concert live at the 19 East Bar
September 17 – Tony Bennett live at the PICC Plenary Hall
September 19 – Rihanna: Diamonds World Tour live at the Mall of Asia Arena
September 26:
The Killers live at the Smart Araneta Coliseum
Zia Quizon: A Little Bit of Lovin live at the Music Museum
September 27 – 202: Debut Performance live at D.L. Umali, UPLB
September 27–29 – Relient K live at the Ayala Malls
September 28:
The Magical Music of Disney live at the CCP Main Theater
Charice and Aiza: The Power of Two live at the Smart Araneta Coliseum
P.O.D. Live at Dutdutan 13 live at the World Trade Center
Bikes, Boards and Bands live at the Republic Wake Park
October 2 – Biodiversity Rocks Concert live at the Hard Rock Cafe
October 3 – Club Life: Tiesto live at the Smart Araneta Coliseum
October 4:
Planetshakers: Night of Fire live at the Qimonda I.T. Center Cebu City
Smart Bro Live and Loud Interactive Concert live at the Trinoma Mindanao Open Parking
October 10 – Fatboy Slim live at the Republiq
October 12 – One More Try: My Husband's Lover The Concert live at the Smart Araneta Coliseum
October 18 – Michael Johnson, Stephen Bishop, Joe Puerta Concert live at the Smart Araneta Coliseum
October 21 – Sugar Ray, Smash Mouth and Gin Blossoms live at the Smart Araneta Coliseum
October 24:
Kesha: Warrior Tour live at the Smart Araneta Coliseum
Super Junior: Super Show 5 live at the Mall of Asia Arena
October 25 – Tanduay Rhum Rockfest Year 7 live at the SM Mall of Asia Concert Grounds
October 26:
Black Party Manila X live at the Smart Araneta Coliseum
Big Fish Cream Halloween Ball live at the World Trade Center
October 28 – Rob Schneider live at the Solaire Resort
October 29 – Libera live at the PICC Plenary Hall
October 30 – Explosions in the Sky live at the Samsung Hall SM Aura
November 3 – Infinite: One Great Step live at the Smart Araneta Coliseum
November 6 – OneRepublic: The Native Tour live at the Smart Araneta Coliseum
November 7 – Aljur Abrenica Come and Get Me Concert live at the Music Museum
November 8 – Matchbox Twenty live at the Mall of Asia Arena
November 9:
Close-Up Forever Summer live at the Bonifacio Global City
Erik Santos inTENse Concert live at the PICC Plenary Hall
Mocha Girls Red Hot Mocha Night live at the Music Museum
November 11 – The Lettermen live at the Newport Performing Arts Theater, Resorts World Manila
November 12 – Myx Mo 2013 live at the SM Mall of Asia Concert Grounds
November 13 – Love Overload Over Asia with John Ford Coley live at the Solaire Resort
November 15:
Sarah Geronimo Perfect 10 Concert live at the Smart Araneta Coliseum
Jed Madela 10th Anniversary Concert live at the PICC Plenary Hall
Greenlight Music Festival live at the Greenfield District
November 16:
Richard Clayderman live at the PICC Plenary Hall
David Elkins live at the Hard Rock Cafe Makati
Tulong Na, Tabang Na, Tayo Na A Benefit Concert live at the Smart Araneta Coliseum
November 20 – Lani Misalucha Queen of the Night live at the Solaire Resort
November 21 – United Republiq featuring Axwell live at the SM Mall of Asia Concert Grounds
November 22 – Martin Nievera 3D The Repeat live at the Smart Araneta Coliseum
November 25:
Alicia Keys: Set the World on Fire Tour live at the Mall of Asia Arena
Tegan and Sara live at the NBC Tent
November 26 – Two Door Cinema Club live at the NBC Tent
November 28 – Sitti Bossa Love Concert live at the Music Museum
November 29 – Enrique Gil King of the Gil live at the Smart Araneta Coliseum
November 30:
Cinema Jam Outdoor Movie and Music Fest live at the Circuit Makati
Sarah Geronimo Perfect 10 Concert The Repeat live at the Mall of Asia Arena
December 6 & 7: Lea Salonga Playlist Concert live at the PICC Plenary Hall
December 7 – Sonic Carnival Feast live at the SM Mall of Asia Concert Grounds
December 11 – Air Supply live at the Solaire Resort
December 12 – Zedd live at the SMX Convention Center
December 14:
Otto Knows live at the Republiq Club 
Exception Music Festival live at the Circuit Makati
December 30 – Boyce Avenue live at the Resorts World Manila

Sports

January 16 – Basketball: The Talk 'N Text Tropang Texters win the sixth PBA championship after defeating the Rain or Shine Elasto Painters at the 2012–13 PBA Philippine Cup Finals win this series 4–0
March 6 – Volleyball: La Salle defeated Ateneo in three sets, 25–23, 25–20, 25–16, to finish the series in two games and win their eighth UAAP women's volleyball championship title. Michele Gumabao was named the Most Valuable Player (MVP) of the Finals.
March 9 – Cheerleading: The Altas Perpsquad won the NCAA Cheerleading Competition. AU Dancing Chiefs placed second, while the EAC Pep Squad placed third.
April 13 – Boxing: Nonito Donaire lost to Guillermo Rigondeaux by unanimous decision, ending his 12-year winning streak since his first loss to Rosendo Sanchez.
May 19 – Basketball:  The Alaska Aces wins defeating the Barangay Ginebra San Miguel with a score of 104–80, winning the 2013 PBA Commissioner's Cup Finals.
June 29 – July 6 – Multi Sport Event:  The Philippines participated in the 2013 Asian Indoor and Martial Arts Games held in Incheon, South Korea from June 29 to July 6. 
July 22 – Basketball: NBA 2013 MVP and Finals MVP LeBron James of the Miami Heat visited the Philippines at Bonifacio Global City, Taguig.
August 1–11 – Basketball: The 2013 FIBA Asia Championship was hosted by the Philippines from August 1–11, 2013 and held at the Mall of Asia Arena at Pasay, Manila. The Philippines men's national basketball team won the silver medal.
August 16–24 – Multi Sport Event: The Philippines competed at the 2013 Asian Youth Games held in Nanjing, People's Republic of China from August 16, 2013, to August 24, 2013. The Philippines have their first ever gold medal for the Asian Youth Games after Mia Legaspi and Princess Superal grabbed the Gold and Silver respectively in Women's Golf.
September 15 – Cheerleading: The NU Pep Squad won the UAAP Cheerdance Competition. UP Pep Squad placed second, while the DLSU Animo Squad placed third.
October 10 – Basketball: The first ever NBA pre-season game was held at the Mall of Asia Arena in the game between the Houston Rockets and the Indiana Pacers . The pre-season game was also the first one to be held in Southeast Asia.
October 11–15 – Football: The Philippines hosted the 2013 Philippine Peace Cup in Bacolod. The Philippines won the tournament.
October 12 – Basketball: Basketball team De La Salle Green Archers defeated the UST Growling Tigers 2–1 in their final series to win their eighth men's title in the UAAP Championships.
October 25 – Basketball San Mig Coffee defeated Petron in 2013 PBA Governors' Cup Finals at Big Dome in Quezon City won score 87–77
November 10 – Boxing: Nonito Donaire won via TKO in the 9th round against Vic Darchinyan.
November 16 – Basketball: Basketball team San Beda Red Lions defeated the Letran Knights 2–1 in their final series to win their nineteenth men's title in the NCAA Championships.
November 23 – Boxing: Manny Pacquiao won via unanimous decision against Brandon Rios to retain the WBO International Welterweight title.
December 11–22 –  2013 Southeast Asian Games: The Philippine Team placed seventh place
December 17 – Basketball: La Salle defeated SWU 2–0 in the best-of-3 finals to win their 2nd PCCL championship.

Broadcasting

Television

Films

Deaths

January 7: Gonzalo G. Puyat II, 79, former president of FIBA 
January 9: Anscar Chupungco, 73, liturgist and theologian, heart attack 
January 23: Erlinda Domingo, mayor of Maconacon, Isabela, murder
January 24: Pepe Pimentel, 83, TV host, stroke
February 8: Elvie Villasanta, actress & comedian, mother of Ariel Villasanta, breast cancer
February 10: Lolong, largest recorded crocodile
February 16: 
Benjamin Dy, 60, Governor of Isabela, emphysema
Fernando Álvarez, 87, former footballer, sports executive and referee
March 10:
 Edelmiro Amante, 79, Congressman of Second District of Agusan del Norte and Executive Secretary, liver cancer
 Danny Zialcita, 73, Filipino movie director, writer and producer, stroke
March 14: Subas Herrero, 69, actor, double pneumonia
March 21: Isagani Cruz, 88, judge and Associate Justice of the Supreme Court of the Philippines, sleep
March 23: Onofre Corpuz, 86, President of the University of the Philippines, illness 
April 23: Jose Solis, 73, Filipino politician, member of the House of Representatives for Sorsogon 2nd District
April 24: Pedro Romualdo, 77, Filipino politician, member of House of Representatives for Camiguin (1987–1998, since 2007), Governor of Camiguin (1998–2007), pneumonia
April 30: Roberto Chabet, 76, Filipino artist, heart attack
May 12: Tita Swarding, 60, radio personality, emphysema
May 12: Daisy Avellana, 96, stage actress and director, National Artist of the Philippines for Theater and Film, illness
May 15: Raul Gonzalez, 78, Filipino journalist, Press Secretary for Diosdado Macapagal (1961–1965), cancer
May 19: Bella Flores, 84, actress, complications from a recent hip surgery
May 28: Eddie Romero, 88, director, National Artist of the Philippines for Theater and Film, prostate cancer
June 12: Hugo Gutierrez, Jr., 86, Filipino jurist, Associate Justice of the Supreme Court of the Philippines, diabetes 
June 26: Sammy Lagmay, 55, former comedian, diabetes
July 5: Ama Quiambao, 65, actress, heart attack
July 6: Ruben J. Villote, 80, Filipino Roman Catholic priest and activist, illness
July 8: Tunggan Mangudadatu Piang, Filipino politician, heart attack
July 9: Andrea Veneracion, 84, Filipina choral conductor, National Artist for Music, stroke
July 22: Ramon T. Jimenez, 89, attorney in the Philippines, illness 
July 26: Roldan Lagbas, Misamis Oriental board member, improvised explosive device
August 12: Karyn Cecilia Velez, 24, badminton sensation, road accident
August 15: Behn Cervantes, 74, Stage and screen actor-director, pneumonia
August 21: Rodolfo Tan Cardoso, 75, Filipino chess player, heart attack
September 7: Susan Fuentes, 58, Queen of Visayan songs, colon cancer
September 11: Frank Chavez, 66, former Solicitor General of the Philippines, stroke
September 13: Nora Daza, veteran gourmet chef, restaurateur, socio-civic leader and television host, 84, pneumonia
September 15: Julius Camba, reporter, 28, car accident
October 7: Leandro Mendoza, Philippine Executive Secretary, 67, heart attack 
October 9: Maximiano Tuazon Cruz, 90, Filipino Roman Catholic prelate, Bishop of Calbayog, illness
October 15: 
Cancio Garcia, 75, Filipino jurist, Associate Justice of the Supreme Court of the Philippines, heart attack
Chito Alcid, 62, showbiz columnist, TV host, colon cancer 
October 18: Alberto G. Romualdez, 73, DOH Secretary, lymphoma 
October 20: Jamalul Kiram III, 75, Sultanate of Sulu, organ failure 
October 27: F. Landa Jocano, 83, Anthropologist, pneumonia 
October 31: Andres Narvasa, 84, Chief Justice, pneumonia 
November 2: Renato del Prado, 73, Character Actor, colon cancer 
November 4: Fr. Joe Dizon, 65, Activist priest, diabetes 
November 13: 
Aiko Baniqued-Moore, 28, Filipina model, head injuries 
Onesimo Cadiz Gordoncillo, 78, Filipino Roman Catholic archbishop, lung cancer 
November 24: June Keithley, 66, Veteran broadcaster, breast cancer 
November 27: Manuel F. Segura, 94, Cebuano World War II veteran and author, pneumonia 
November 29: Joash Dignos, radio anchor of DXGT, gunshot
December 6: Michael Milo, radio anchor of PRIME Radio FM, gunshot
December 9: Cornelio Agaid Padilla Jr., 67, cyclist, heart failure 
December 11: Rogelio Butalid, 44, radio anchor of DXTG, gunshot 
December 13: Delfin Bangit, 58, 39th Chief of Staff of the Armed Forces of the Philippines, multiple organ failure 
December 18: Dominic Gamboa, 47, frontman of Tropical Depression, kidney failure
December 20: Ukol Talumpa, Mayor of Labangan, Zamboanga del Sur, murder
December 25: Ismael Mathay, Jr., 81, former mayor of Quezon City, cardiac arrest

References

 
Philippines
Philippines
2010s in the Philippines
Years of the 21st century in the Philippines